Acropora verweyi is a species of acroporid coral found in the southwest and northern Indian Ocean, the central Indo-Pacific, Australia, southeast Asia, Japan, the East China Sea and the oceanic western Pacific Ocean. It is also found in the Philippines, American Samoa, Fiji and Rodrigues.

Taxonomy
Acropora verweyi was described in 1984 by Veron and Carden Wallace.

Description
It is found in encrusted colonies arranged in cushion-, plate-shaped, or corymbose structures. Its branches are short and have diameters of seven to nine millimetres and contain very short branchlets growing near their bases. Its axial corallites are obvious and its radial corallites are appressed, tube-shaped, orderly arranged, and round. The species is a mostly a cream-brown colour and its axial corallites are yellow.

Distribution
It is classed as a vulnerable species on the IUCN Red List and it is believed that its population is decreasing in line with the global decline in coral reefs; the species is also listed under Appendix II of CITES. Figures of its population are unknown, but is likely to be threatened by the global reduction of coral reefs, the increase of temperature causing coral bleaching, climate change, human activity, the crown-of-thorns starfish and disease. It occurs in the southwest and northern Indian Ocean, the central Indo-Pacific, Australia, southeast Asia, Japan, the East China Sea and the oceanic western Pacific Ocean.

References

Acropora
Cnidarians of the Pacific Ocean
Fauna of the Indian Ocean
Marine fauna of Asia
Marine fauna of Oceania
Fauna of Southeast Asia
Vulnerable fauna of Asia
Vulnerable fauna of Oceania
Animals described in 1984